Pradosia mutisii was a species of plant in the family Sapotaceae. It was endemic to Colombia.

References

mutisii
Endemic flora of Colombia
Extinct plants
Taxonomy articles created by Polbot
Taxa named by Arthur Cronquist